The Mississippi Valley Conference is a high school athletic league in the Metro-East region of southwestern Illinois. It has schools from the counties of Jersey, Madison, Monroe, and St. Clair. All of its members are class "AA" in Illinois' two-class and three-class systems and "AAA" in the four-class system.

Member schools

 Triad left to become an Independent in 1978. They joined the SCC in 1985 prior to returning to the MVC.

Former members

History 
The Mississippi Valley Conference was formed in 1971 and has been one of the most stable conferences in Illinois high school athletics. The MVC was initially formed by Civic Memorial, Highland, Jersey Community, Mascoutah, O’Fallon, Roxana, Triad, and East Alton-Wood River High Schools. Ironically, the name Mississippi Valley had been used 2 times previous with the first occurrence happening in 1922 with teams from Macomb, Carthage, Pittsfield and Quincy from Illinois and Fort Madison and Keokuk in Iowa. This incarnation of the conference only lasted one season. In 1957, the name was resurrected with teams from East Moline, Moline and Rock Island from Illinois joining an Iowa conference by the same name that included teams from Cedar Rapids and Davenport Iowa. This league is still in operation today in Iowa, however, the three Illinois schools left at the end of the 1969 school year.

While most conferences in Illinois have gone through many changes in membership, with some conferences expanding while others have disappeared over the years, the MVC has been a beacon of stability. O’Fallon withdrew in 1993 due to a significantly increasing student enrollment and joined the South Seven Conference and ultimately ended up as members of the Southwestern Conference. Triad left the MVC in 1979, but rejoined in 1993. Roxana and East Alton-Wood River withdrew from the Mississippi Valley in 1998 due to decreasing enrollment and joined the South Central Conference, where Roxana remains, while EAWR is now a member of the Prairie State Conference. Waterloo joined the MVC in 1998 to take the place of Roxana and East Alton-Wood River. The MVC currently has six schools, of which five are Charter members. During the 40+ year history of the league, there has only been three instances of schools entering or leaving the conference. This is remarkable stability and something of which the MVC and its member schools are extremely proud.

Membership timeline

Sports
A listing of the sports and the seasons they are played in:

Fall
Boys' Cross-Country
Girls' Cross-Country
Football
Boys' Golf
Girls' Golf
Boys' Soccer
Girls' Tennis
Volleyball

Winter
Boys' Basketball
Girls' Basketball
Wrestling
Boys Bowling
Girls Bowling

Spring
Boys' Baseball
Girls' Soccer
Girls' Softball
Boys' Tennis
Boys' Track and Field
Girls' Track and Field

In addition, schools compete in activities such as bass fishing, competitive cheerleading, competitive dance, and scholastic bowl - though none of those are organized at the conference level.

State Trophies

Bethalto (Civic Memorial)
 Competitive Dance:  2nd (1A-2013)
 Softball:  4th (3A-2011)

Highland
 Softball: 1st (3A-2021)
 Baseball:  1st (3A-2008, 3A-2015)
 Bass Fishing:  1st (2012)
 Competitive Dance:  1st (1A-2014)

Mascoutah
 Football:  1st (3A-1979)
 Softball:  4th (AA-1991)
 Speech, Individual Events:  2nd (1965)

Troy (Triad)
 Baseball:  4th (3A-2012)
 Boys Soccer: 3rd (2A-2009)
 Competitive Cheerleading:  1st (M-2005), 3rd (M-2008)
 Competitive Dance:  2nd (1A-2015)
 Girls Soccer:  1st (2A-2011), 2nd (A-2003), 1st (2A-2017)
 Wrestling: 4th (2A-2009)

Waterloo (H.S.)
 Baseball:  3rd (3A-2011)
 Boys Soccer:  3rd (2A-2010), 1st (2A-2017)
 Football:  2nd (3A-1993)

References

External links
"Illinois High School Association". 16 September 2007.

Illinois high school sports conferences
Education in Jersey County, Illinois
Education in Madison County, Illinois
Education in Monroe County, Illinois
Education in St. Clair County, Illinois